James Henry Carr (March 25, 1933 – August 13, 2012) was an American football player who played nine seasons for the Chicago Cardinals, the Philadelphia Eagles and the Washington Redskins of the National Football League (NFL). Carr also played one season in the Canadian Football League with the Montreal Alouettes in 1958.  He was the starting left corner with the Philadelphia Eagles in 1960 when they won the World Championship beating the Green Bay Packers.  He played college football at Morris Harvey (now the University of Charleston) in Charleston, West Virginia.  While there he played in three bowl games and was one of three NAIA Hall of Fame inductees in 1962.  He also played high school football and baseball at East Bank High School in East Bank, West Virginia.

After retiring as a player, he served 24 seasons as an NFL assistant coach for the Minnesota Vikings, the Chicago Bears, the Philadelphia Eagles, the Detroit Lions, the Buffalo Bills, the San Francisco 49ers, the New England Patriots, and the Atlanta Falcons.  He also coached two years in the United States Football League and three years in NFL Europe.  In 1985, he coached in the Super Bowl on the defensive staff of the New England Patriots.  Carr was known as a defensive innovator implementing nickel packages, seven defensive backs, eleven man fronts, zone blitz schemes and special zones well before they came into common practice.  Coaches who learned under his tutelage include Fritz Shurmur, Jerry Glanville, Floyd Reese, and Bill Belichick.

Jimmy Carr died on August 13, 2012 at the age of 79.  He became a born-again Christian at age 62.  His wife Lila was vital to his faith and his career.

References

 Harold Rosenthal, The Big Play. p. 102 (New York, NY, Random House, 1965)
 David Halberstam, The Education of a Coach.  p. 121 (Hyperion, 2006)

External links
 The Eagles Encyclopedia
 Jimmy Carr of 1960 Philadelphia Eagles dies, 79

1933 births
2012 deaths
People from Cabin Creek, West Virginia
Players of American football from West Virginia
American football cornerbacks
Chicago Cardinals players
Philadelphia Eagles players
Washington Redskins players
Minnesota Vikings coaches
Chicago Bears coaches
Philadelphia Eagles coaches
Detroit Lions coaches
Buffalo Bills coaches
San Francisco 49ers coaches
United States Football League coaches
New England Patriots coaches
Atlanta Falcons coaches
Amsterdam Admirals coaches
London Monarchs coaches
Scottish Claymores coaches
Charleston Golden Eagles football players